The Hill Rag is a community newspaper based in Washington, D.C.'s Capitol Hill neighborhood.  It is published monthly. In addition to Capitol Hill, it provides coverage of the Southwest Waterfront, H Street Northeast, and Navy Yard neighborhoods. The Hill Rag is owned by Capital Community News Inc., one of the largest publishing firms of community-based publications in the United States, which also owns several other DC newspapers and publications.

It should not be confused with The Hill, a weekly newspaper covering the United States Congress.

External links 
Capital Community News

Capitol Hill
Newspapers published in Washington, D.C.